Encantado (Portuguese for "charmed") may refer to:

Places
Encantado, Rio de Janeiro, a neighbourhood in Rio de Janeiro city, Brazil
Encantado, Rio Grande do Sul, a city in Rio Grande do Sul, Brazil
Encantado River, a river in Paraná, Brazil
Encantado, New Mexico, a community in the United States

Other uses
Encantado (album), an album by Brazilian dance group System 7
Encantado (mythology), a mythical river dolphin in Brazilian culture

See also
 Encantada (disambiguation), the female form of the same word
 Encantador (disambiguation)
La Encantadora, DC Comics cosmic entity supervillain
El Encantador, Colombian telenovela